The William S. Hart Union High School District (commonly referred to simply as the Hart District) is a school district in the Santa Clarita Valley of Los Angeles County, California. It serves all of the valley's high school students (grades 9–12) and most of its junior high school students (grades 7–8). As of 2019–20, the total number of enrolled students (in 16 schools) was 23,019. The district's superintendent is Mike Kuhlman. The district is named after William S. Hart, one of the first western film stars, who lived in Newhall and was a local benefactor. The region served by the Hart District is also served by the Sulphur Springs, Saugus, Castaic, and Newhall elementary school districts.

High schools
Academy of the Canyons (a middle college high school in partnership with College of the Canyons)
Bowman High School
Learning Post High School
Canyon High School
Castaic High School
Golden Valley High School
William S. Hart High School
Saugus High School
Valencia High School
West Ranch High School
SCVi Charter School

Junior high schools

Student demographics
As of the 2021-22 school year, 23,019 students were enrolled in Hart District schools. 43% of students were Hispanic or Latino, 34.4% were non-Hispanic white, 12.9% were Asian American, and 4.2% were African American.

Feeder districts
Castaic Union School District: serves Castaic, Val Verde, and a small portion of northwestern Valencia.
Newhall School District: serves Stevenson Ranch, southern Valencia, and almost all of Newhall.
Saugus Union School District: serves Saugus, northern Valencia, and western Canyon Country.
Sulphur Springs School District: serves the majority of Canyon Country and part of northeastern Newhall.

The Castaic, Newhall, and Saugus Union school districts have offices in Valencia, while the Sulphur Springs School District's office is in Canyon Country. Castaic Union School District serves grades K-8; the other districts serve grades K-6.

Governing Board
Hart District governing board members are composed of five members, elected to a four-year term, by geographical district. The elections are held on a Tuesday after the first Monday in November of even numbered years.

References

External links

Official website
School zone map

School districts in Los Angeles County, California
Education in Santa Clarita, California